Ctenognophos is a genus of moths in the family Geometridae.

Species 
 Ctenognophos burmesteri (Graeser, 1888)
 Ctenognophos eolaria (Guenée, 1857)
 Ctenognophos solianikovi (Viidalepp, 1988)
 Ctenognophos tetarte (Wehrli, 1931)

References 
 Ctenognophos at Markku Savela's Lepidoptera and Some Other Life Forms
 Natural History Museum Lepidoptera genus database

Gnophini
Geometridae genera